Khuzi (also Romanized as Khūzī; also known as Hūzi) is a city in Khuzi Rural District, Varavi District, Mohr County, Fars Province, Iran. At the 2006 census, its population was 2,277, in 481 families.

References 

Populated places in Mohr County
Cities in Fars Province